Bergbambos is a genus of flowering plants belonging to the family Poaceae.

Its native range is Southern Africa.

Species:

Bergbambos tessellata

References

Poaceae
Poaceae genera